Edward Baldwin may refer to:

 William Godwin (pen name Edward Baldwin; 1756–1836), English journalist, political philosopher and novelist
 Edward Baldwin, 4th Earl Baldwin of Bewdley (1938–2021), British educator, hereditary peer and Crossbench member of the House of Lords
 Edward Baldwin, main character of the American science fiction web television series For All Mankind

See also
 
 Edward Baldwyn (1746–1817), English clergyman and pamphleteer
 Ted Baldwin (disambiguation)